Columbia-Shuswap C (South Shuswap) is a regional district electoral area in the Columbia-Shuswap Regional District, British Columbia, Canada. The electoral area is located in south-central BC between the Main Arm and Salmon Arm of Shuswap Lake.  It has no governmental or administrative function and only describes voting boundaries for the election of rural representatives to the regional district board.

According to the Canada 2001 Census:
Population: 6,762 (exclusive of Indian reserve residents)
% Change (1996-2001): 7.8
Dwellings: 4,120
Area (km².): 506.36
Density (persons per km²): 13.4

Communities
Bastion Bay
Carlin
Eagle Bay
Paradise Point
Tillis Landing
White Lake
Wild Rose Bay

Regional district electoral areas in British Columbia
Columbia-Shuswap Regional District